Zahid Mansoor (born 29 December 1989) is a Pakistani first-class cricketer who plays for Water and Power Development Authority.

References

External links
 

1989 births
Living people
Pakistani cricketers
Water and Power Development Authority cricketers
Cricketers from Rawalpindi
Central Punjab cricketers